John "Jack" Pratt (13 April 1906 – 11 January 1988) was a British-born Canadian professional ice hockey player who played 37 games in the National Hockey League with the Boston Bruins between 1930 and 1932. The rest of his career, which lasted from 1927 to 1940, was spent in minor leagues. Pratt was born in Edinburgh, Scotland, but grew up in Rossland, British Columbia.

Career statistics

Regular season and playoffs

See also
List of National Hockey League players from the United Kingdom

References

External links
 

1906 births
1988 deaths
Boston Bruins players
Boston Cubs players
Boston Tigers (CAHL) players
Canadian ice hockey players
Ice hockey people from British Columbia
Sportspeople from Edinburgh
People from Rossland, British Columbia
Philadelphia Ramblers players
Portland Buckaroos players